Rafiyath Rameeza (23 March 1976) is a Maldivian singer.

Early life
Rafiyath Rameeza was born and raised in the "Rameez family" where several artists including Ali Rameez and Ibrahim Rameez were brought up and "ruled" the music industry. At the age of 12, while studying at Aminiya School, she competed in the Television Maldives Interschool Singing Competition and continued to participate in the same competition for more years. In 1993, at the age of seventeen, while studying at Malé English School, Rameeza performed the song "Kaakuhey Mithaahuree" in the competition which fetched the award for best performer from her age category and was ranked in the second place of the competition. The following year, she performed the song "Heylaa Hure Ey" which again resulted in her winning the first place in the age category and second place in overall from the competition. She credited the old Bollywood classical songs for the trainings, vocal exercises and techniques she had learnt in singing.

After completing her studies, Rameeza worked as a secretary at a law firm for eight years. While she was working at this job, Rameeza married one of her singing duet partners, Ibrahim Amir, the brother of two renowned singers, Ahmed Amir and Fazeela Amir. During this time she worked as a mentor for the young generation artists including: Aishath Maain Rasheed, Lahufa Faiz and Meera Mohamed Majid. After giving birth to her first child, Rameeza quits the job and started recording for albums and films as a hobby.

Career
Upon release of her first recording, Rameeza received several offers from music directors and producers to sing for their films and albums. The song "Liyunu Sitee Ey", from the album Furaana (1998) was the breakthrough performance by Rameeza, where she carved a niche in the "slow romantic and high-pitched" genre. Rameeza believes she is more "confident" and her "voice suits better" in slow tracks rather than fast-paced songs, though she began experimenting with her "lower vocal range" later in the career.

2010 witnessed a "new rise" in Rameeza where she recorded for several films including Veeraana and Niuma while remaking some old classical songs like "Ey Zamaana" and "Saahibaa" for Dhin Veynuge Hithaamaigaa and "Hiyy Adhu Ronee Ey" for Heyonuvaane. The song "Aadhey Aadhey" from Zalzalaa En'buri Aun released during the same year fetched her a Gaumee Film Award nomination for Best Female Playback Singer. A sequel to her song of the same name from the film Zalzalaa (2000), "Aadhey Aadhey" was praised by the music critics for her "haunting" vocals. In 2011, the Government of Maldives honoured her with the National Award of Recognition, which Rameeza attributed as her biggest achievement. She is celebrated as one of the few singers who remains in the top of the industry since the 1990s.

Apart from singing, Rameeza made a brief appearance in the in Ali Shifau-directed horror film Fathis Handhuvaruge Feshun 3D which serves as a prequel to Fathis Handhuvaru (1997), where she played the role Zoona, which was played by Niuma Mohamed in its sequel and was noted as a "surprising and unseen" side of Rameeza.

In the media
In a publication from Haveeru Daily, Maisoon Moosa praised her "excellence in dominating the slow romantic song genre for over 25 years, despite the rise in new talents and styles" and commended her for "still remaining relevant in the industry while her contemporaries faded". In an interview from Avas, Ahmed Nadheem calling her the "Evergreen Queen of Maldives" noted that she has "a voice that does not deteriorate and a beauty that never fades with age". Apart from that, her "discipline" and "work ethics" were appraised in the media where she is always seen "wearing long sleeved" and "socially acceptable" dresses in public gatherings.

Discography

Feature film

Short films

Television

Non-film songs

Religious / Madhaha

Filmography

Accolades

References 

Living people
People from Malé
1976 births
Maldivian playback singers